DACA or Daca may refer to:

People
 Estevan Daça (c. 1537 – between 1591 and 1596), Spanish composer
 Čika Dača (1878–1967), Serbian footballer
 Ahmet Daca (died 1945), political figure of the Sandžak region of the Balkans

Other uses
Deferred Action for Childhood Arrivals, a United States immigration policy that began in 2012.
Darwen Aldridge Community Academy, a secondary school in Blackburn with Darwen borough of Lancashire, England, UK
Dominion Association of Chartered Accountants, former name of the Canadian Institute of Chartered Accountants
Dumaguete Academy for Culinary Arts, a cooking school in the Philippines